Female is the biological sex of an ovum-producing organism.
 Female plant, a plant that gives rise to female gametophytes

Female may also refer to:

Gender
 Female, the gender of women and girls
 Woman, a female adult
 Girl, a young female person, usually a child or adolescent
 Femininity, attributes associated with women and girls

Arts and entertainment
Female (novel), a 1933 novel by Donald Henderson Clarke
Female (1933 film), starring Ruth Chatterton
Female (2005 film), a Japanese film compilation
Female (song), 2017, by Keith Urban
"Female", a poem by Patti Smith from her 1972 book Seventh Heaven

Other uses 
 Feminine gender, a grammatical class of nouns in many languages
 Female connector, in hardware and electronics, a type of connector, often but not always a "jack"

See also
Male (disambiguation)
Male and Female (disambiguation)
Masculine (disambiguation)
Feminine (disambiguation)